Ronald Unger (born April 30, 1968) is a retired Austrian football goalkeeper.

Honours

 Austrian Cup winner: 2000-01
 Austrian Supercup winner: 2001
 Austrian Football First League winner: 2000-01

External links
 

1968 births
Living people
Austrian footballers
SC Eisenstadt players
SK Rapid Wien players
FC Kärnten players
First Vienna FC players
SV Ried players
TSV Hartberg players
Association football goalkeepers